The Allotrope Foundation is a consortium of pharmaceutical companies, instrument vendors and software companies to simplify the exchange of scientific electronic data. It publishes the Allotrope Foundation Ontology (AFO) which is a controlled vocabulary to structure data, the Allotrope Data Models (ADM) and the Allotrope Data Format (ADF) based on HDF5 which incorporates those for use in practice. Standardization aims at the goal of FAIR data.

References

Foundations based in Washington, D.C.